Divers diseases or Divers disease can mean:
 In the King James translation of the Bible, and similar older literature, "various diseases"; compare "diverse"
 See Diving hazards and precautions
Decompression sickness, or “divers’ disease”